The Sheffield & Hallamshire Senior Cup is a county cup competition involving teams within the Sheffield and Hallamshire County Football Association.  Originally named the Sheffield Challenge Cup, it is the 5th oldest surviving cup competition in the world, after the FA Cup (1871–72), Scottish FA Cup (1873–74),  East of Scotland Shield (1875–76), and Birmingham Senior Cup (1876-77). and

Sheffield and Hallamshire County Football Association members at levels 5–11 of the English football league system are currently eligible to compete in the competition.

From 1925/26 to 1945/46 the competition was split into two, with the Sheffield & Hallamshire Invitation Cup acting as the more senior competition.

History

2022–23 Participants

Finals

Winners
Bold indicates club is still (2022) active.

 14 wins – Sheffield Wednesday, Frickley Athletic
 13 wins – Worksop Town
 10 wins – Sheffield United
 8 wins – Emley (I)
 6 wins – Stocksbridge Park Steels
 5 wins –  Denaby United, Sheffield
 4 wins – Doncaster Rovers, Hallam, Mexborough Town
 3 wins – Mexborough, Barnsley
 2 wins – Lockwood Brothers, Rotherham Town (I), Rotherham County, Rotherham Town (II), South Kirkby Colliery, Mexborough Athletic, Upton Colliery, Rawmarsh Welfare, Beighton Miners Welfare, Royal Army Service Corps, Bentley Colliery, Shaw Lane
 1 win – Thursday Wanderers, Staveley, Heeley, Wombwell, Wath Athletic, Darfield, Ardsley Athletic, Dinnington Athletic, Firbeck Main, Norton Woodseats, Manvers Main, Wombwell Athletic, Thurcroft Welfare, Harworth Colliery, Royston Social, Stocksbridge Works, Grimethorpe Miners Welfare, Redfearn Sports, Kiveton Park, Frecheville Community Association, Maltby Main, Athersley Recreation, North Gawber Colliery

Invitation Cup

The county FA ran a second Senior Cup competition from 1925/26 to 1945/46, the  Sheffield & Hallamshire Invitation Cup.

The competition was open to the more senior non-league clubs in the region as well as the reserve teams of the area's professional (Barnsley, Doncaster Rovers, Rotherham United, Sheffield United and Sheffield Wednesday).

Finals

Winners 
5 wins – Sheffield Wednesday reserves
3 wins – Barnsley reserves, Doncaster Rovers reserves
2 wins – Royal Army Service Corps
1 win – Sheffield United reserves, Bolsover Colliery, Thurcroft Main, Firbeck Main, Thurnscoe Victoria

See also
 Sheffield & Hallamshire County Cup
 Sheffield & Hallamshire County Senior League
 Wharncliffe Charity Cup

References

External links 
Official Site

Sports competitions in Sheffield
Recurring sporting events established in 1876
Football in South Yorkshire
1876 establishments in England
County Cup competitions
Football competitions in Yorkshire